The following lists events that happened during 1945 in the People's Republic of Albania.

Incumbents
President: Omer Nishani, Chairman of the Presidium of the Constituent Assembly
Prime Minister: Enver Hoxha, Chairmen of the Council of Ministers

Events
January
 Communist provisional government agrees to restore Kosovo to Yugoslavia as an autonomous region; tribunals begin to condemn thousands of "war criminals" and "enemies of the people" to death or to prison. Communist regime begins to nationalize industry, transportation, forests, pastures.
April
 Yugoslavia recognizes communist government in Albania.
November	
 Soviet Union recognizes provisional government; 
 Britain and United States make full diplomatic recognition conditional.

Births
 1 March - Xhevahir Spahiu, writer
 9 March - Llazi Sërbo, movie and theater actor, director
 5 May - Saimir Kumbaro, film director

Deaths
 1 March - Luigj Bumçi, catholic religious and political figure
 14 April - Fejzi Alizoti, politician
 18 April - William, Prince of Albania
 3 July - Sotir Kolea, folklorist, diplomat and activist of the Albanian National Awakening
 Bahri Omari, politician, publisher, and writer
 Thanas Floqi, educator and patriot, and one of the signatories of the Albanian Declaration of Independence

References

 
1940s in Albania
Years of the 20th century in Albania